Raj Khurana (2 September 1956 – 25 December 2016) was an Indian politician and socialist from Punjab who was a Chief Parliamentary Secretary (Finance), Punjab. A member of the Bharatiya Janata Party, Khurana previously held the finance portfolios for Badal government and served as the Member of legislative assembly(india) for the constituency of Rajpura, Punjab. He had the privilege to serve Rajpura as an M.L.A for three tenures. He has been a chairman of many trusts and societies. He has both socially and economically been a representative of the Bhawalpur society.

Early life 
Raj Khurana was born to Sh. Piara Lal in Rajpura. Lal was a migrant from Pakistan who worked in Rajpura as a laborer. After facing all the hardships and difficulties in life, his financial conditions improved over the passage of time and he ended up becoming a commission agent in the grain market of Rajpura. Later he gained popularity due to the fact of him being one of the founding members of Lions Club, rajpura. He spent the later part of his life as a social worker and remained engaged in organizing medical eye camps. He also contributed a lot in the development of his city. These values passed on to his son, who later turned out to be a celebrated politician of the city Rajpura.

Education 
Raj Khurana obtained his primary education from K.K Public School, Rajpura. He obtained his bachelor's degree from S.A. Jain College.

Career 
Following the footsteps of his father, Raj Khurana started his career as a commission agent in the grain market, Rajpura in 1971. Soon, things took a turn, and then he began dealing in a fertilizer business. In this business, he gained great prosperity and also received highest sale awards for an outstanding performance in trading.

Political career
Raj Khurana contested his first election to the Punjab Vidhan Sabha in 1992 from Rajpura as a candidate of the Indian National Congress. In 1997, he lost to Balram Das Tandon of the BJP, but defeated Tandon in 2002. In 2006, following differences with the Congress leadership, he joined the BJP and was granted the party ticket in 2007, which he won. In 2012, he lost the election to Hardial Singh Kamboj of the Indian National Congress.

Controversy 
Raj Khurana was arrested by the Central Bureau of Investigation in May 2011, following which he resigned.

Personal life 
Raj Khurana was married to Raj Kumari on 2 March 1976. The couple had three children, two daughters and a son.

References 

1956 births
2016 deaths
People from Patiala district
Punjab, India MLAs 2007–2012
Bharatiya Janata Party politicians from Punjab
State cabinet ministers of Punjab, India
Speakers of the Punjab Legislative Assembly